Juliana Rodrigues Veloso (born December 22, 1980 in Rio de Janeiro) is a female diver from Brazil who competed in five consecutive Summer Olympics for her native country, from Sydney 2000 to Rio 2016. She claimed two gold medals at the 2008 South American Swimming Championships in São Paulo.

Notes

References

External links
 

1980 births
Living people
Brazilian female divers
Olympic divers of Brazil
Divers at the 2000 Summer Olympics
Divers at the 2004 Summer Olympics
Divers at the 2008 Summer Olympics
Divers at the 2012 Summer Olympics
Divers at the 2016 Summer Olympics
Pan American Games silver medalists for Brazil
Pan American Games bronze medalists for Brazil
Pan American Games medalists in diving
Divers at the 2003 Pan American Games
Divers at the 2007 Pan American Games
Divers at the 2011 Pan American Games
Divers at the 2015 Pan American Games
Universiade medalists in diving
Divers from Rio de Janeiro (city)
South American Games gold medalists for Brazil
South American Games silver medalists for Brazil
South American Games medalists in diving
Competitors at the 2010 South American Games
Universiade bronze medalists for Brazil
Divers at the 2019 Pan American Games
Medalists at the 2005 Summer Universiade
Medalists at the 2003 Pan American Games
Medalists at the 2007 Pan American Games
Sportspeople from Rio de Janeiro (city)
21st-century Brazilian women
20th-century Brazilian women